Mary Arnold may refer to:

 Mary Arnold (tennis) (1916–1975), American tennis player
 Mary Anne Arnold (1825–?), English sailor and crossdresser
 Mary Arnold (singer) (born 1947), American singer
 Mary Daisy Arnold (1873–1955), American botanical artist
 Mary Ellicott Arnold (1876–1968), American social activist, teacher and writer
 Mary Peterson Arnold (1885–1973), American politician
 Mary Augusta Ward (née Arnold; 1851–1920), British writer